Narendra Raval (born 1962) is a Kenyan industrialist, entrepreneur and philanthropist of Indian Gujarati origin. Raval who serves as the Executive Chairman of the Devki Group of Companies, a conglomerate in East Africa that manufactures steel, aluminum and cement. 

He is estimated to have a net worth of US$400 million as of 2015 and ranks 46th richest African and 2nd richest Kenyan based on the 2015 Forbes list of Africa's richest in Kenya.

Background
He was born in India circa 1962. He became a priest at the temple of the Brahmin Hindu sect at age 11 years, while still in India. While still a teenager, Raval came to Kenya to work as an assistant priest at a temple in Kisumu, in the western part of Kenya, on the shores of Lake Victoria. In 1986, he abandoned his priesthood, married a Kenyan woman and with his wife started trading in building materials, starting out in the open marketplace (Gikomba), in Nairobi.

Career
Over the next 35 years, beginning in 1986, Raval has built an industrial empire of companies that manufacture building materials in various locations in Kenya and a subsidiary in neighboring Uganda. His conglomerate is also reported to maintain a subsidiary in the Democratic Republic of the Congo. As of April 2021, the Devki Group of Companies that he founded have manufacturing revenue in excess of US$650 million annually. His personal net worth is estimated in excess of US$500 million. Devki Group employs over 6,500 people, as of April 2021.

The companies of the Devki Group include, but are not limited to the list below. They span manufacture of steel, aluminum and cement. One company is into aviation. Devki Group also owns a cement manufacturing factory in the Ugandan border town of Tororo.
1. Devki Steel Mills Limited, 2. Maisha Mabati Mills Limited, 3. National Cement Company Limited, 4. Maisha Packaging Company Limited, 5. Northwood Aviation and 6. Simba Cement Uganda Limited.

Family
Narendra Raval is married to Neeta Raval, a medical doctor. Together they are parents to three children, two sons and a daughter.

Other considerations
Narendra Raval is a passionate philanthropist who has publicly pledged to leave 50 percent of his wealth to charity and the remaining 50 percent to his children. His autobiography titled "Guru: A Long Walk To Success by Narendra Raval with Kailash Mota" was released in 2018. Raval is reported to donate all proceeds from the book to charity.

In March 2022, the Devki Group divested from Sosian Energy, a Kenyan independent power producer (IPP) which owns a concession contract to build a 35 megawatts geothermal power station in the Menengai Crater. The ownership was sold to Gideon Moi, at an undisclosed monetary consideration.

See also
 List of cement manufacturers in Kenya

References

External links
 Website of Devki Group of Companies
 Rise and rise of cement tycoon under Kibaki, Uhuru regimes As of 26 May 2019.

1952 births
Living people
Kenyan Hindus
Devki Group
Kenyan businesspeople
Kenyan philanthropists
Indian emigrants to Kenya
Kenyan chief executives
Businesspeople of Indian descent